Jan Peeters (born 12 January 1963) is a Flemish politician and member of the Different Socialist Party (SP.A). He is a Member of the Belgian Chamber of Representatives and was a Secretary of State for four years. He was a minister for a short while in 1999 following the resignation of Marcel Colla. He is also the Mayor of Herentals since 2001. In May 2010, he announced that he would leave national politics.

Political career
1991 - 1995: Member of the Belgian Chamber of Representatives
1995 - 1999: Secretary of State for Safety, Social Integration and Environment
1999: Minister of Pensions, Safety, Social Integration and Environment
1999 - 2010: Member of the Belgian Chamber of Representatives
2001–present: Mayor of Herentals

References

1963 births
Living people
Socialistische Partij Anders politicians
Members of the Belgian Federal Parliament
People from Herentals
Grand Officers of the Order of Leopold II
21st-century Belgian politicians